Kurt Nehrling (February 13, 1899 – December 22, 1943) was a German Social Democratic politician and member of the German resistance against Hitler. Nehrling was responsible for supplying information to the Soviet Union and hid banned books. He was later caught by the SS and killed at the Dachau concentration camp.

Biography

Kurt Nehrling was born in Weimar to restaurateurs Max and Emma Nehrling. His parents' restaurant, Zum Goldenen Stern in the Jakobstrasse, was a popular workers' tavern and served as a meeting place for members of the Social-Democratic People Association (a local chapter of the SPD). This exposure influenced Nehrling's future political career.
From 1901 to 1905, membership in the local chapter of the SPD increased dramatically from 120 to 616. The party therefore created an autonomous social and cultural environment in the worker-populated areas of the Weimar. In 1907, the Social Democrats, trade unions, and associations laid the foundation for their own building, the "Community Center". Two years later, a local group of the Socialist Worker Youth was founded there.

Nehrling joined the SPD in 1919. In the years following World War I, he worked at the district administration of Weimar. There he became acquainted with Marie Prox, the daughter of Emil Prox, the chairman to the Social Democratic People Association. In 1921, Nehrling married Prox but tragedy struck two years later when Marie died from complications of childbirth with their second child. Nehrling, however, continued to maintain strong relations with his father-in-law. Although Prox is not very well remembered today, Nehrling's son later recalled his significance on his father's life.

In 1923, Nehrling was working as an employee in the Thuringian Ministry of Economic Affairs when he met and later married his second wife, Hedwig Nehrling.

In 1929, Nehrling became ill with tuberculosis. This was a long illness, finally breaking in 1931.  Although employed in the Thüringer government, the National Socialists broke all relationship with the SPD in 1933 and terminated all non-National Socialist employment. Kurt and Hedwig Nehrling had immense financial problems in these years. In their dwelling they opened Homestead Way 16 (today Kurt Nehrling road) a provisional linen shop. Later moving to a corner shop at the Zeppelinplatz. At this time Kurt Nehrling joined the Social-Democratic Reichsbanner Schwarz-Rot-Gold, a front fighter organization formed to defend the Republic from National Socialist control.

See also
German Resistance

References

1899 births
1943 deaths
German civilians killed in World War II
Politicians from Weimar
People from Saxe-Weimar-Eisenach
Executed German Resistance members
Resistance members who died in Nazi concentration camps
German people who died in Dachau concentration camp
Politicians who died in Nazi concentration camps
People from Thuringia executed in Nazi concentration camps